Trifluralin is a commonly used pre-emergence herbicide.  With about  used in the United States in 2001, it is one of the most widely used herbicides.  Trifluralin is generally applied to the soil to provide control of a variety of annual grass and broadleaf weed species.  It inhibits root development by interrupting mitosis, and thus can control weeds as they germinate.

Environmental Regulation
Trifluralin has been banned in the European Union since 20 March 2008, primarily due to high toxicity to aquatic life.

Trifluralin is on the United States Environmental Protection Agency list of Hazardous Air Pollutants as a regulated substance under the Clean Air Act.

Environmental behavior
Trifluralin undergoes an extremely complex fate in the environment and is transiently transformed into many different products as it degrades, ultimately being incorporated into soil-bound residues or converted to carbon dioxide (mineralized).  Among the more unusual behaviors of trifluralin is inactivation in wet soils.  This has been linked to transformation of the herbicide by reduced soil minerals, which in turn had been previously reduced by soil microorganisms using them as electron acceptors in the absence of oxygen.  This environmental degradation process has been reported for many structurally related herbicides (dinitroanilines) as well as a variety of explosives like TNT and picric acid.

References

External links

Preemergent herbicides
Nitrobenzenes
Anilines
Trifluoromethyl compounds
Endocrine disruptors